Yakou Méïté (born 11 February 1996) is a French-Ivorian professional football player who plays as a Striker for English EFL Championship club Reading and the Ivory Coast national team.

Personal Life
Méïté was born and raised in France to Ivorian parents.

Club career

Paris Saint Germain
Born in Paris, Méïté started his professional career at Paris Saint-Germain. He made his professional debut on 9 April 2016, in a Ligue 1 match against Guingamp, replacing Jean-Kévin Augustin after 91 minutes, in a 2–0 away win.

Reading
On 29 July 2016, Méïté signed a three-year contract with English side Reading. He made his debut for Reading as a substitute in an EFL Cup tie against Plymouth Argyle on 9 August 2016, with his first goal for the club coming on 21 January 2017, during a 3–2 defeat to Derby County in the Championship.

On 8 July 2017, Méïté moved to Sochaux, on a season-long loan deal.

On 3 October 2018, Reading announced that Méïté had signed a new contract with Reading, until the summer of 2022. On his return to Reading, he became a mainstay as the club's striker and scored 6 goals in 5 games, impressing manager Paul Clement.

In August 2019, Méïté spoke out about racist abuse he received on social media. He said he chose to do so due to the impact it had on players. On 4 July 2020, he scored four goals in a 5–0 win away at Luton Town.

International career
Méïté has represented the Ivory Coast U17s and U20s. He debuted for the Ivory Coast U23s in a 5–0 friendly win over the Togo U23s on 27 March 2018.

Méïté was called up to the senior Ivory Coast squad for a friendly against Togo in March 2018. He was selected for the 2019 Africa Cup of Nations qualifying match against Guinea on 18 November 2018. He made his debut for the Ivory Coast on 26 March 2019, in a 1–0 victory over Liberia, playing 73 minutes before being replaced by eventual goalscorer Jonathan Kodjia.

Style of play
Méïté is a physically strong player. He has impressive strength, ability in the air, speed and tireless stamina. Paul Clement praised him for his workrate and willingness to battle for every ball.

Career statistics

Club

International

Honours
Paris Saint-Germain U19
 Championnat National U19: 2015–16
 UEFA Youth League runner-up: 2015–16

Paris Saint-Germain
 Ligue 1: 2015–16

References

External links 
 

1996 births
Living people
Footballers from Paris
French footballers
Ivorian footballers
Association football wingers
French sportspeople of Ivorian descent
Paris Saint-Germain F.C. players
Reading F.C. players
FC Sochaux-Montbéliard players
Ligue 1 players
English Football League players
Ligue 2 players
Ivory Coast youth international footballers
Ivory Coast under-20 international footballers
Ivory Coast international footballers
Expatriate footballers in England
Ivorian expatriate footballers
Ivorian expatriate sportspeople in England